Long Ping Estate is a mixed TPS and public housing estate in Wang Chau, Yuen Long, New Territories, Hong Kong, near MTR Long Ping station. It is the third public housing estate in Yuen Long Town and the largest public housing estate in Yuen Long New Town, consisting of fifteen residential blocks completed between 1986 and 1989. Some of the flats were sold to tenants through Tenants Purchase Scheme Phase 6B in 2005.

Houses

Demographics
According to the 2016 by-census, Long Ping Estate had a population of 23,687. The median age was 45.5 and the majority of residents (97.8 per cent) were of Chinese ethnicity. The average household size was 2.9 people. The median monthly household income of all households (i.e. including both economically active and inactive households) was HK$22,500.

Politics
For the 2019 District Council election, the estate fell within two constituencies. Most of the estate is located in the Pek Long constituency, which is currently represented by Kwong Chun-yu, while the remainder of the estate falls within the Nam Ping constituency, which is currently represented by Zachary Wong Wai-yin.

Education
Long Ping Estate is in Primary One Admission (POA) School Net 73. Within the school net are multiple aided schools (operated independently but funded with government money) and one government school: South Yuen Long Government Primary School (南元朗官立小學).

See also

Public housing estates in Yuen Long

References

Yuen Long Town
Public housing estates in Hong Kong
Tenants Purchase Scheme